Bunde may refer to:

People
Con Bunde (born 1938), American educator and politician

Places
Bunde, Germany, a town in the Leer District in Lower Saxony, Germany
Bunde, Netherlands, a town in the municipality of Meerssen in Limburg, the Netherlands
Bünde, a town in North Rhine-Westphalia, Germany
Bunde, Minnesota, an unincorporated community, United States

See also
Bunda (disambiguation)